Manson Chikowero (born 22 December 1999) is a Zimbabwean cricketer. He made his first-class debut for Mid West Rhinos in the 2016–17 Logan Cup on 17 May 2017. He made his Twenty20 debut for Mid West Rhinos in the 2018–19 Stanbic Bank 20 Series on 17 March 2019. He made his List A debut on 4 February 2020, for Rangers in the 2019–20 Pro50 Championship. In December 2020, he was selected to play for the Rhinos in the 2020–21 Logan Cup.

References

External links
 

1999 births
Living people
Zimbabwean cricketers
Mid West Rhinos cricketers
Rangers cricketers
Place of birth missing (living people)